is a Japanese flower artist, botanical sculptor, and co-founder of JARDINS des FLEURS.

Biography 

Born in Fukuoka Prefecture, Azuma moved to Tokyo in 1997 to pursue his dream of becoming a rock musician. Around this time he took a job as a trader in the Ota Market, one of Japan's largest flower and produce markets. He cites his job at the Ota Market as the inspiration for pursuing a career in flowers. With his interest in ornamental flowers piqued, he then took a job managing a flower shop in Azabu-Jūban in 1999.

Azuma began his career as a flower artist in 2002 with the opening of the flower shop JARDINS des FLEURS. He partnered with photographer Shiinoki Shunsuketo to open the flower shop. Around 2005 Azuma began to explore a new form of floral design that he called botanical sculpture, the work for which he is now known.

Career 

2016
 Sep 28 - Stage Collaboration with Dries Van Noten 2017 S/S Women's collection, using original artwork "Iced Flowers"
 Sep 20-25 - Installation, "Botanical sculpture" for FUJIFILM's booth at Photokina, Cologne, Germany
 Aug 27 - Sep 25 - Art Installation, "Drop Time" at the Mass in Jingumae, Tokyo
 Jun 21 - Art Installation, "Burning Flowers" at an Old Rock Quarry Site in Tochigi, Japan 
 May 16–29 – Art Collaboration, “FENDI FLOWERLAND” at Selfridges & Co, London
 Apr 9-10 – Exhibition, Botanical Sculpture #6 Dynamite at AMFC, Tokyo
 Apr – Botanical installation live, “PALM TREE x ALGIERS”
 Mar 25 - Apr 17 – Art Collaboration, “FENDI FLOWERLAND” at FENDI GINZA, Tokyo
 Mar 17 – May 9 – Exhibition, Human l Nature curated by Andrew Zuckerman #5 capsule at CHAMBER, NYC
 Mar 9-15 – Art Collaboration, “FENDI FLOWERLAND” at Isetan Shinjuku, Tokyo
 Feb 19-21 – Exhibition, “Botanical Sculpture Polypore” at AMFC, Tokyo
 Jan 25-30 – Art installation, “PETAL BOX” at Colette, Paris
2015
 Dec – Art direction, “Flower Universe” for Planetarium at Haneda international airport, Tokyo
 Nov – Installation, “Fur Tree” for FENDI Ginza pop-up store, Tokyo
 Nov – Exhibition, “Azuma Makoto Exposition”, Lambersart, France
 Nov – Installation for Christmas table of Royal Copenhagen “Silent forest”, Tokyo
 Oct – Exhibition, ”Shiki : Landscape and Beyond”, Dallas
 Oct – Art product, “Paludarium OSAMU” in CHAMBER NYC, NY
 Sep – Art/Visual direction, Book of Pierre Herme ”SATINE”
 Jul – Exhibition, “Blue Flower Rebellion”, Saga
 Mar – Publication, “ENCYCLOPEDIA OF FLOWERS ll” released from Seigensha
 Feb 13 – Art project “DAGAT & BULAKLAK”, in Philippines
 Jan 10-11 – Exhibition, “ICED FLOWERS”, Saitama
2014
 Jul – Art project “EXOBIOTANICA”, in the Black Rock Desert in Nevada
 Jul – Popup shop “Floral shop AMKK” at the POOL aoyama, Minamiaoyama, Tokyo
 Jun – Publication, “Flower Method Azuma Makoto” released from Bijutsu Shuppan
 Jun – Installation of the entire floor for the opening ceremony at Toranomon Hills, Tokyo
 May – Botanical Installation x live concert “The Lost Eden” for Dragon-i, Hong Kong
 Apr – Special installation for Salvatore Ferragamo, at Isetan Shinjuku, Tokyo
 Mar – Stage design for NHK Special 4 nights series “Adventure of Human body, the microscopic world”
 Mar – Installation for the renewal opening of the fifth floor at Isetan Shinjuku, Tokyo
 Mar – Second installment of Installation live “shiki x hakata cycos”, at the ex-pit for Ōya stone, Tochigi
 Mar – Collaboration work with artist, Aya Takano “Shuen no mori, soshite hajimari (Forest of the end, and the beginning)” at Kaikaikiki Gallery, Motoazabu, Tokyo
 Mar – Flower visual work for Dries van Noten “Inspirations” exhibition at Les Arts Décoratifs, Paris
 Jan – Permanent exhibition of “Timeless pine” for an entrance of the office in Roppongi, Tokyo
2013
 Dec – Installation, “The world’s smallest ice skate link” (in forest), Maison Hermès, Ginza
 Dec – Ongoing installation for 6 months “Botanical Sculpture#6 Dance”, Hotel entrance, Shinjuku, Tokyo
 Nov – 30th anniversary installation, “Bottle Flower tree”, Imperial Hotel, Tokyo
 Oct – Public art installation, art fair “Abierto Mexicano Dedisano”, Mexico
 Sep – Flower installation, Pierre Herme Paris new collection presentation, Tokyo
 Sep – Flower installation, Pierre Herme Paris new collection presentation, Hong Kong
 Aug – Botanical installation, “Botanical Ashtray”, Daikanyama T-SITE, Tokyo
 Aug – 1st permanent botanical installation, “Cocoon”, Fukushimameisei High School, Fukushima
 Jul − “Encyclopedia of Flowers” selected for ”50BOOKS 50COVERS” at design competition in the United States
 May −Botanical installation live “shiki×Naturopolis-Tokyo”, live house, Roppongi, Tokyo
 May – Flower installation for the special party at Galerie Perrotin, Hong Kong
 Apr – Exhibition in collaboration with the jewelry brand BOUCHERON, Roppongi Hills, Tokyo
 Apr – Vegetation and design objet chief director, Roppongi Hills 10th anniversary decoration, Roppongi Hills, Tokyo
 Mar – Installation “Collapsible leaves”, Isetan Shinjuku Grand Opening, entire floor,
 Mar – Art exhibition “Paludarium Shigelu”, Broached Gallery, Melbourne, Australia
 Mar – Vegetation director, “HOUSE VISION 2013 Tokyo Exhibition”, Aomi, Tokyo
 Mar – Publication, “Flower and I”(Kyuryudo) released
 Nov – Window display “Toki no niwa – Jardin du Temps –“, Maison Hermès, Ginza, Tokyo
2012
 Oct – Released compilation book “Encyclopedia of Flowers” English version (Lars Müller Publishers).
 Sep – Art Exhibition as a part of Perrier-Jouët Belle Epoque Florale Edition launch for a month, São Paulo, Brazil
 Aug – Installation live “shiki-toe” at a warehouse in Kiba, Tokyo
 Jul – Released compilation book “Encyclopedia of Flowers” (Seigensha).
 Jul – Collaboration, “Belle Epoque Florale Edition” with Perrier-Jouët
 Apr – Art Exhibition, Original artwork of “LADY DIOR AS SEEN BY”, Ginza, Tokyo
 Apr – Art Exhibition at “Luminale2012”, Frankfurt, Germany
 Mar 11 – Apr 15 – Art Exhibition, “Time of moss” at “DESIGNING DESIGN“, Zendai Contemporary Art Space, Shanghai
 Feb – Creative Director, SUNTORY Midorie (Urban ecological development project)
2011
 Nov - Stage production, live performance “Hana to Mizu” (Naruyoshi Kikuchi & Hiroshi Minami) Tokyo
 Nov – Publication, “2009 – 2011 Flowers” collection of artwork book released, Tokyo
 Oct – Art Installation, Cassina ixc. (Interior) Aoyama, Tokyo
 Oct – Art collaboration, fashion brand HELMUT LANG featuring “MAKOTO AZUMA#2”, Tokyo
 Oct – Art Exhibition, “Collapsible leaves” at gallery GYRE EYE OF GYRE, Tokyo
 Aug – Art Exhibition, “Botanical Sculpture #3 lump” at gallery void+, Tokyo
 Jun – Art Exhibition, “Time of moss” at Beijing Center for the Arts, China
 May – Art video work, “Drop time”
 May – Art collaboration, fashion brand HELMUT LANG featuring “MAKOTO AZUMA”, Tokyo
 Feb – Art Exhibition, ”shiki × bulb” at Triennale Design Museum, Milan
2010
 Dec – Art Exhibition, ”shiki × bulb” at IMPOSSIBLE PROJECT SPACE, Tokyo
 Nov – Art Exhibition, ”Alter Nature” at art center Z33, Belgium
 Aug – Art Production, Landscape Design at boutique Valveat81, Tokyo.
 Aug – Art Exhibition, “Frozen Flower” at gallery void+, Tokyo.
 Aug – Launched Azuma Makoto Gardening Club
 Jul – Art Production, ”BOTANICA ” mobile concept, KDDI (mobile communication), Tokyo
 Jun – Art Exhibition, ”TOKYO FIBER SENSEWARE” at Design Museum Holon, Israel
 May – Art Exhibition, ”Shiki1”, at Shanghai EXPO Japan industrial pavilion, Shanghai
 Apr – Publication, monthly free paper “AMNP: Azuma Makoto News Paper”
 Mar – Art Produce, ”Fashion In Nature“ at Galerie Michel Rein, Paris
 Feb – Art Exhibition, “armored pine” at POLA Museum Annex, Tokyo
 Feb – Art Installation, “Botanical Signboard” (advertisement) at MAZDA Zoom-Zoom stadium, Hiroshima
2009
 Dec – Art Exhibition, “Bridge of Plants” at ARK Hills, Tokyo
 Oct – Art Production & Exhibition, produced flower vase “hand vase”, Tokyo
 Oct – Art Exhibition, “adidas Originals ” (fashion/sports collaboration), Tokyo
 Sep – Art Exhibition, “TOKYO FIBER ’09 SENSEWARE” at 21_21 DESIGN SIGHT, Tokyo
 Jul – Plants Installation, “Naoshima Sento I♥Yu”, at Naoshima public bath, Kagawa
 May – Art Exhibition, “Daido Moriyama ‘Kiroku” on the road collaboration with 8 creators”, Tokyo
 May – Art Exhibition, “Distortion × Flowers” GYRE EYE OF GYRE, Tokyo
 Apr – Art Exhibition, “TOKYO FIBER ’09 SENSEWARE”, Triennale Design Museum, Milano
 Mar – Art Exhibition, ”Azuma Makoto ’AMPG vol.25’” at Gallery Mitsubishi Artium (IMS), Fukuoka
2008
 Oct – Art Exhibition, “2nd nature” at 21_21 DESIGN SIGHT, Tokyo
 Jul – Art Exhibition, “BOTANICA(×)” at NRW Forum, Germany
2007
 Apr – Art Exhibition, ”SHIRO NO KI” at Maison Martin Margiera, Tokyo
 Apr – Art Exhibition, opened private gallery “AMPG” for two years in Tokyo
2006
 Nov – Art Performance, “Kehai” for ”Les Soirees Nomades” (Cartier), Paris
 Mar – Art Exhibition at gallery Mitsubishi-Jisho Artium (IMS), Fukuoka
2005
 Dec – Art Exhibition at Sony building in Ginza, Tokyo
 Dec – Art Exhibition, Christmas window display at popular select shop, colette in Paris
 Nov – Art Exhibition, first collection outside Japan in Tribeca, New York

Selected works 

 Polypore, February 2016 
 Iced Flowers, January 2015 
 Exobiotanica, July 2014

References

Flower artists
1976 births
Living people